Ramalina sanctae-helenae is a species of saxicolous (rock-dwelling), fruticose lichen in the family Ramalinaceae. It is found in the remote tropical island of Saint Helena, where it grows in semi-desert areas and on cliffs throughout the island. It was formally described as a new species in 2008 by Dutch lichenologist André Aptroot. Thin-layer chromatography shows that the species contains usnic acid, and, depending on the strain, sometimes boninic acid, protocetraric acid, and divaricatic acid. The species epithet refers to the type locality. According to the author, the presence of various chemical strains of the lichen suggest that it is undergoing speciation.

References

External links
 Pictures of Tropical Lichens – Image of species 

sanctae-helenae
Lichen species
Lichens described in 2008
Taxa named by André Aptroot
Lichens of the middle Atlantic Ocean